The Grumman XF12F was the proposed designation of two fighter aircraft designed by Grumman: 

 Grumman F11F-1F Super Tiger or G-98J, a 1956 single-seat prototype
 Grumman G-118, an unbuilt two-seat, carrier-based interceptor